Mohamad Khairul Asyraf bin Ramli (born 31 December 1994) is a Malaysian footballer who plays  for Malaysia Super League side Perak.

Club career

Kelantan
In December 2017, Khairul Asyraf signed a two-year contract with Malaysia Super League side Kelantan after his contract with PKNP expired.

Career statistics

Club

References

External links
 

1994 births
People from Kelantan
Living people
DRB-Hicom F.C. players
PKNP FC players
Kelantan FA players
Perak F.C. players
Malaysian footballers
Association football defenders
Malaysia Super League players
Malaysian people of Malay descent